Dometic Group is a Swedish company that manufactures a variety of products, notably for the outdoor, recreational vehicle, marine, and hospitality industries in the areas of Food & Beverage, Climate, Power & Control, and other applications. It operates in the Americas, EMEA and Asia Pacific.

Dometic sells its products in approximately 100 countries and has a global distribution and dealer network in place to serve the aftermarket. Dometic employs approximately 8,500 people worldwide, had net sales of SEK 29.8 billion in 2022 and is headquartered in Solna, Sweden.

In November 2015, the company went public through an IPO on Nasdaq Stockholm.

The company was founded in 1923 and has its headquarters in Solna, Sweden. Dometic is a global provider of products and solutions for mobile living in the areas of Food & Beverage, Climate, Power & Control, Sanitation and Safety & Security.

References

External links 
 

Manufacturing companies based in Stockholm
2001 establishments in Sweden
Companies established in 2001
Companies listed on Nasdaq Stockholm
Companies based in Solna Municipality